Nadia Rui-chi Lim (born 21 December 1985) is a New Zealand celebrity chef, entrepreneur, food writer and television personality. Lim is known as the self-proclaimed "Nude Cook" as an advocate of natural, unprocessed foods, and for creating healthy, nutritious recipes by putting a health focus behind food, which is influenced by her background as a clinical dietitian.

Early life and education 

Lim is of New Zealander and Chinese-Malaysian heritage and was born in Auckland to Julie and Ken Lim. At six years of age she moved to Kuala Lumpur where she lived for about six years. She has said that her experiences in two cultures influence her fusion cooking style of Asian and European cuisines.

Career 
Lim graduated from the University of Otago in 2008 with a bachelor's degree in applied science in human nutrition and postgraduate diploma in dietetics. She worked from 2008 to 2011 for the Auckland District Health Board as a clinical dietitian, specialising in diabetes. She describes her recipes as healthy and focused on moderation. Lim believes that this is due in part to her background as a diabetes dietitian and understanding nutrition science.

Television 
Lim won the second series of MasterChef New Zealand, airing on TV One on New Zealand in 2011; the United Kingdom in 2012 on UKTV; and in the Netherlands in 2013.

In 2014 the Asian Food Channel commissioned an eight-part television show, New Zealand with Nadia Lim, which was screened during primetime across 14 countries throughout Asia, to an audience of 130 million. The show was produced to increase awareness of New Zealand food and culture with Asian audiences. New Zealand with Nadia Lim was also aired by SkyTV's Food TV channel from August 2014 and TVNZ's TV ONE from November 2014.

Lim was a guest judge on the first series of My Kitchen Rules New Zealand, which broadcast on TV ONE in 2014 and on TV TWO in 2015; she returned again in the reboot series on TV Two in 2017 and 2018.

She appeared on the eighth series of Dancing with the Stars in 2019 where she made it to the semifinals.

In 2020 she appeared on her own series, Nadia's Comfort Kitchen, in which she focused on cooking during the COVID-19 lockdown in New Zealand. Her two children appear in most episodes and her husband functioned as the cameraman. The recipes from the series were published in a cookbook, Nadia's Comfort Kitchen, which raised money for charity.

In 2022 she was one of three judges of the seventh series of MasterChef New Zealand.

In 2022 she and her husband participated in a multipart series Nadia's Farm.

Cookbooks 
Lim's first cookbook, Nadia's Kitchen, was released in 2012 by Random House and is focused on healthy original recipes.

In 2013, Lim released her second best-selling cookbook, Nadia Lim's Good Food Cookbook. This book received runner-up at the 2014 International Gourmand Cookbook of the Year awards (Best TV Chef category). Lim's cookbook, Vegful, also went onto receive a runner-up prize for the best Vegetarian cookbook in the world in 2019.

My Food Bag 
Lim is a founder of My Food Bag, a New Zealand home delivery service that delivers recipes and fresh ingredients to customers' doors. The service was launched in 2013 by Cecilia and James Robinson, together with Lim and her husband, Carlos Bagrie, and ex-Telecom CEO Theresa Gattung.

An Australian division was launched in Sydney in August 2014. For the sixth series of MasterChef New Zealand, the winner would be employed to work for her as a chef/menu-planner as part of the prize package. She was also a guest judge on episode 12, where the winner of her "Mystery Bag – Match made in Heaven Challenge" can have their dish featured in the company's recipe, which also served as a job trial.

Charitable work 
Lim has worked with a number of New Zealand charities, partnering with Diabetes New Zealand, the Heart Foundation, the Blind Foundation, the Cancer Society, the Hospice, KidsCan and Garden to Table to help encourage healthy eating and the Cambodia Charitable Trust to raise awareness of the poverty trap of underprivileged children in Cambodia. During the New Zealand lockdown with Covid19 Nadia filmed a television show hosted on TV1 called Nadia's Comfort Kitchen. Following the success of the show, Lim released a cookbook where 100% of the profits were donated to two charities. In one week this raised $405,000 which was subsequently donated to Youthline and the Women's Refuge. During 2020 she released a children's book, Marvellous Marvin, with all author proceeds from the book being donated to no-kill animal shelter HUHA and food education charity Garden to Table.

Nadia: A Seasonal Journal 
In December 2020, Lim launched a quarterly print publication in partnership with Lifestyle Magazine Group. Nadia: A Seasonal Journal celebrates growing, harvesting and cooking with fresh produce through the seasons. A portion of each sale goes to the Garden to Table charity, which teaches children the essential skills of gardening and cooking.

Personal life 
Lim is married to Carlos Bagrie and has two sons, Bodhi and River.
On the 4 October 2022, Lim announced on Facebook that she is pregnant with her and Bagrie's third child, due in the summer.
Her father Ken died in 2014 from cancer.

References 

1985 births
Dietitians
Living people
New Zealand chefs
New Zealand television personalities
New Zealand people of Chinese descent
New Zealand people of Malaysian descent
Participants in New Zealand reality television series
Vegetarian cookbook writers